Elvira López may refer to: 
 Elvira López (actress) (born 1966), Chilean actress
 Elvira López (feminist), Argentinian feminist and author